Jean-Paul Behr (born 29 June 1947) is a French chemist, elected member of the French Academy of Sciences (since December 2008).

Research director at the CNRS, he is known for his work in the field of nucleic acid vectorization.

Training and career 
 1969 Engineer ENS Chimie de Strasbourg
 1973 Doctor of Science
 1974- Research fellow, then research director at the CNRS
 1989- Director of the Genetic Chemistry Laboratory at the University of Strasbourg

Scientific activities 
Jean-Paul Behr has spent most of his career at the University of Strasbourg. After a doctorate in physical organic chemistry under the supervision of Jean-Marie Lehn (1973) followed by a postdoctoral internship in England, he founded the Genetic Chemistry Laboratory at the Faculty of Pharmacy in Strasbourg. His research there focused mainly on the development of molecules capable of encapsulating DNA and transporting it inside living cells. Jean-Paul Behr developed the first effective lipid vectors, then polymeric, which were marketed under the names TransfectamTM, LipofectamineTM and jetPEITM. These vectors are widely used as transfection agents for animal cells in culture, but also as drug-gene carriers in clinical gene therapy trials. To this end, he founded two biotechnology companies, Eurothéra (1994–97) and Polyplus-transfection (2001).

Awards and honours 
    Research & Sharing Prize "Gene Therapy" (1992)
    CNRS Silver Medal (1998)
    Paul Ehrlich Prize, Society of Therapeutic Chemistry (2000)
    Grand Prize founded by the State of the French Academy of Sciences (2000)
    Biotech Award of the International Pharmaceutical Federation (2003)

References

External links
    [1] [archive]
    Biography of the Academy of Sciences. http://www.academie-sciences.fr/fr/Liste-des-membres-de-l-Academie-des-sciences-/-B/jean-paul-behr.html
    Towards artificial viruses. https://www.lemonde.fr/savoirs-et-connaissances/article/2002/10/21/jean-paul-behr-vers-des-virus-artificiels_295032_3328.html
    The drug revolution of the future. http://sante.lefigaro.fr/actualite/2012/03/16/17774-revolution-medicaments-futur

1947 births
Living people
20th-century French chemists
21st-century French chemists
French National Centre for Scientific Research awards
Research directors of the French National Centre for Scientific Research
Members of the French Academy of Sciences
Academic staff of the University of Strasbourg